Khalifa University is a public research university located in Abu Dhabi, United Arab Emirates. It was ranked as the 181st best university in the world by QS world university rankings of 2023.

Founded in 2007 by a decree issued by UAE President His Highness Sheikh Khalifa Bin Zayed Al Nahyan, Khalifa University was established in an effort to support a knowledge-based economy that will contribute to the state’s post-oil future.

Currently, it is merging with  The Petroleum Institute and Masdar Institute of Science and Technology.

The university has a student population of approximately 1300.

In the 2019 Times Higher Education Asia University Rankings, Khalifa University placed as the 28th best university in Asia. In September 2018, Khalifa University was ranked 1st in the UAE and 2nd in the Arab region by the Times Higher Education (THE) World University Rankings 2019. The AI Institute has a funding outlay of AED 160 million for a five-year period.

History 
Originally established in 1989 as the Etisalat College of Engineering (ECE), the school’s main campus was built in Sharjah, and aimed to supply the Emirates Telecommunications Corporation (Etisalat) with technologically trained workers.

Khalifa University’s current president, Tod A. Laursen, was appointed in August 2010. As of 2013, KU faculty and staff come from over 40 countries, and its student body is internationally diverse and co-educational.

Organization 
Khalifa University offers 12 undergraduate degrees through its College of Engineering:

 B.Sc. in Aerospace Engineering
 B.Sc. in Biomedical Engineering
 B.Sc. in Civil Engineering
 B.Sc. in Communication Engineering
 B.Sc. in Computer Engineering (with optional concentration in Software Systems)
 B.Sc. in Electrical and Electronic Engineering (with optional concentration in Power Systems)
 B.Sc. in Industrial and Systems Engineering
 B.Sc. in Mechanical Engineering
 B.Sc. in Petroleum Engineering
 B.Sc. in Petroleum Geosciences
 B.Sc. in Chemistry
 B.Sc. in Mechanical Mathematics and Statistics

There are 15 postgraduate programs of study under the College of Engineering and the Institute of International & Civil Security:

 M.A. in International and Civil Security
 M.Sc. in Information Security
 M.Sc. in Chemical Engineering
 M.Sc. in Electrical and Computer Engineering
 M.Sc. in Engineering Systems and Management
 M.Sc. in Materials Science and Engineering
 M.Sc. in Petroleum Engineering
 M.Sc. in Sustainable Critical Infrastructure
 M.Sc. in Water and Environmental Engineering
 M.Sc. by Research in Engineering
 Master of Engineering in Health, Safety and Environmental Engineering
 M.Sc. in Mechanical Engineering
 M.Sc. in Nuclear Engineering
 M.Sc. by Research in Engineering (Electrical and Computer)
 Ph.D. in Engineering (with the option to specialize in Electrical and Computer, Mechanical, Aerospace, Biomedical, Nuclear, or Robotics Engineering)

International & Civil Security 
Distinct in the Gulf, Khalifa University's Institute for International and Civil Security (IICS) seeks to "produce research which will strengthen the security of the UAE in a way that is responsive to the needs of national and global security decision-makers ... enabling the programme to make major contributions that enhance regional, international and human security." The IICS's director is Professor Joel Hayward, "a world authority on international conflict and strategy".

Accreditation 
The three original undergraduate B.Eng. (Hons.) degree programs offered by Khalifa University (Communication, Computer, and Electronic Engineering) have been awarded accreditation by the Institution of Engineering and Technology (IET).

Academic partnership 
In recent years, KU has established a number of international academic and research partnerships. They include associations with the Georgia Institute of Technology, Texas A&M University Nuclear Security Science & Policy Institute, and KAIST. In April 2011, Khalifa University signed a memorandum of understanding with the University of Bristol to establish and create the Visual Signal Analysis and Processing (VSAP) research centre at the university’s Abu Dhabi campus.

Campuses 
Campus Expansion

The University has plans to build a new campus near the current campus of Abu Dhabi. The new campus would be 80 hectares (198 acres) in size and allow enrollment to increase up to 6,000 students.  The new campus will house a medical school, state of the art labs, a student hub, and sporting facilities.

Student life 
Khalifa University’s campus student newsletter is KU TIMES, which is published once a month. Students can also participate in various clubs and academic organizations ranging from student government to the sports club.

Scholarship 
Some of the scholarships that the university offers include;
 Khalifa University Scholarship  
 ADNOC Scholarship Program  
 Telecommunication Regulatory Authority (TRA) Scholarship "Betha"  
 UAE Nuclear Energy Scholarship Program (ENEC & FANR)  
 National Electronic Security Authority (NESA) - Tamayuz Scholarship Program  
 The Future Teachers scholarship  
 Buhooth Scholarships  
 KU MED Scholarships

Rankings 

Khalifa University has been ranked on 211th position in QS World University Rankings in 2020.
The Times Higher Education World University Rankings ranked it 301-350 globally in the 2020 ranking, 31 in Asia in 2020, and 14 among Emerging Economies University Rankings 2020. The Academic Ranking of World Universities, placed Khalifa University at 701-800 in the world ranking.

References

External links
 Khalifa University

Universities and colleges in the Emirate of Abu Dhabi
Khalifa University
Education in the United Arab Emirates
Educational institutions established in 2007
Universities and colleges in Sharjah (city)